Tall ([[Pashto ۔ٹال) is an administrative unit, known as Ward in Tehsil Kabal, of Swat District in the Khyber Pakhtunkhwa province of Pakistan.

According to Khyber Pakhtunkhwa Local Government Act 2013. District Swat has 67 Wards, of which total amount of Village Councils is 170, and Neighbourhood Councils is 44.

Dardiyal is Territorial Ward, which is further divided in four Village Councils:
 Dardiyal No. 1 (Village Council)
 Dardiyal No. 2 (Village Council)
 Bara Samai (Village Council)
 Tall (Village Council)

Dardiyal No. 1 
Village Council Dardiyal No. 1 consist of:
 PC Dardiyal (Mairai, Khaadi, Aryanai, Kas No. 1, Gatkow, Pacha Kalay, Gul Banda, Bago)
Population of Village Council Dardiyal No. 1 is 5600, and number of General Seats in Local Bodies Election is 7.

Dardiyal No. 2 
Village Council Dardiyal No. 2 consist of:
 PC Dardiyal (Qazi abad, Choor, Smaste, Penawrai, Dardial, Kamkhlai, Kas No. 2, Kal Maira)
Population of Village Council Dardiyal No. 2 is 4429, and number of General Seats in Local Bodies Election is 7.

Bara Samai 
Village Council Bara Samai consist of:
 PC Bara Samai (Mauza Bara Samai)
Population of Village Council Bara Samai is 8660, and number of General Seats in Local Bodies Election is 9.

Tall 
Village Council Tall  consist of:
 PC Bara Samai (Mauza Tall)
Population of Village Council Tall  is 8660, and number of General Seats in Local Bodies Election is 9.

See also 
 Kabal, Tehsil
 Manglawar
 Swat District

References

External links
 Khyber-Pakhtunkhwa Government website section on Lower Dir
 United Nations
 Hajjinfo.org Uploads
 PBS paiman.jsi.com
 Neighbourhood Council 

Swat District
Populated places in Swat District
Union councils of Khyber Pakhtunkhwa
Union Councils of Swat District